The 2011 Cerveza Club Premium Open was a professional tennis tournament played on clay courts. It was the 17th edition of the tournament which was part of the 2011 ATP Challenger Tour. It took place in Quito, Ecuador between 17 and 23 October 2011.

Doubles
Daniel Garza and Eric Nunez were the defending champions but Garza decided not to participate.
Nunez played alongside Benjamin Balleret but lost in the first round.
Juan Sebastián Gómez and Maciek Sykut won the tournament after defeating Andre Begemann and Izak van der Merwe 3–6, 7–5, [10–8] in the final.

Seeds

Draw

Draw

References
 Main Draw

Cerveza Club Premium Open - Doubles
2011 Doubles